Aletopus is a genus of moths of the family Noctuidae.

Species
 Aletopus imperialis Jordan, 1926 (from Tanzania)
 Aletopus ruspina (Aurivillius, 1909) (from Congo-Brazzaville)

References

 Aletopus at Markku Savela's Lepidoptera and Some Other Life Forms
 Natural History Museum Lepidoptera genus database

Agaristinae
Noctuoidea genera